was a Japanese samurai daimyō of the Edo period. He was head of a cadet branch of the Sakai clan.

Career
In 1601, Tadatoshi was made head of Tanaka Domain (10,000 koku) in Suruga Province. His holdings were transferred in 1609 to Kawagoe Domain (30,000
koku) in Musashi Province.

References

|-

Daimyo
Rōjū
Sakai clan
1562 births
1627 deaths